Práctica (a practice session) is a term for an informal event where Argentine tango, Salsa or Bachata is danced.  Prácticas are often held on a regular basis (usually weekly), in an exercise space with full-length mirrors, like a dance studio.

The main focus of a Práctica is on practicing the dance, techniques, and improvisation.  Participants may practise alone, focussing on their own conditioning, or in pairs, doing the usual leading-following sequences.

Trainer is optional in a practica.  If he is present and leads the movement for the group, this may be called a guided practica.

Although a Milonga is also an event for dancing tango, there are several differences:

 dancers go to the milonga to socialise, so dress code is more formal or party-like,
 halls for milongas are bigger, with part of the area allotted for seats and tables,
 there are strict rules about how the music is arranged in curated sets of tandas and broken up by cortinas

These format and customs of the milonga come from the customs in Argentina.

Some organisers may combine the practica and milonga into one event, and call it practilonga.

Sources/Links 
 Glossary Of Dance Terms
 List of practicas around the world

Tango dance